Al-Wasṭīyah is one of the districts  of Irbid governorate, Jordan.

References 

Districts of Jordan